Jeanie Oliver Davidson Smith (Davidson; pen name, Temple Oliver; 1836 – November 16, 1925) was an American poet and romancist. She contributed to leading British and U.S. magazines and published several books, continuing her writings almost to the time of her death.

Early life and education
Jeanie Oliver Davidson was born in Troy, New York, 1836. Her parents were Richard and Margaret Oliver (Amos) Davidson. Her father was Scottish by birth and was well known in Troy as a philanthropist; he later became a resident of New York City. Her mother was a member of the Oliver family, conspicuous in southern Scotland. From both parents, she inherited poetic and artistic tendencies. When her mother died, the young girl went with an aunt to Scotland, and for five years, she lived in Edinburgh, where she was educated thoroughly and liberally. After graduation, she returned to the United States.

Career

At an early age, she married Hon. Horace E. Smith (d. 1902), dean of the Albany Law School. After her marriage, she lived in Johnstown, New York where her home was known as a social and literary center. She cared for her two young daughters and for the large family of her husband by a former marriage. Her time was filled with literary, society and charitable work, and she was especially interested in religious and educational matters. 

Her literary productions were numerous and included poems, tales and sketches. She contributed to leading British and U.S. magazines, such as The Magazine of Poetry, Christian at Work, and others. She published a volume of poems, Day Lilies (New York, 1889), which passed into its second edition and won her substantial reputation as a poet. She was the author of The Mayor of Kanameta (New York, 1891), a story on sociological lines, also Donald Moncrieff, a companion book to the former (Buffalo, 1892). Her finest work was done in verse.

She was a member of the Society of American Authors, Aldine Literature Society, New York Presbyterian Church, Authors League of America, and the Pen and Brush Club of New York.

Later life and death
She continued her writings almost to the time of her death. Jeanie Oliver Davidson Smith died at her home in Johnstown, New York, November 16, 1925.

Selected works
 Day Lilies, 1889
 Christmas Day, 189?
 The Mayor of Kanemeta, 1891
 Donald Moncrieff, 1892
 Stories of Fido and Hunter, 1896
 The Story of Blackie, 1896
 The Christ: A Poetical Study of His Life from Advent to ..., 1899 (with Obadiah Cyrus Auringer)
 Sonnets of Life, 1911
 A Forest Idyl, 1913
 The Seal of Hellas: (a Classical Drama)
 The Story of Zephyr: A Christmas Story, 1917

References

Attribution

External links
 

1836 births
1925 deaths
Wikipedia articles incorporating text from A Woman of the Century
People from Troy, New York
Writers from New York (state)
19th-century American writers
19th-century American women writers
20th-century American writers
20th-century American women writers
20th-century pseudonymous writers
Pseudonymous women writers